Bezdědice may refer to the following places in the Czech Republic:
Bezdědice (Bělá pod Bezdězem)
Bezdědice (Hostomice)